Horní Beřkovice is a municipality and village in Litoměřice District in the Ústí nad Labem Region of the Czech Republic. It has about 1,000 inhabitants.

Economy
The municipality contains a psychiatric hospital, and a firing range for the police.

Notable people
Klementina Kalašová (1850–1889), opera singer

References

Villages in Litoměřice District